Cochituate is a census-designated place (CDP) in the town of Wayland in Middlesex County, Massachusetts, United States. The population was 6,569 at the 2010 census.

Geography

According to the United States Census Bureau, the CDP has a total area of 10.8 km2 (4.2 mi2). 9.9 km2 (3.8 mi2) of it is land and 0.8 km2 (0.3 mi2) of it (7.69%) is water.

It is home to Lake Cochituate and Dudley Pond. Both are used by residents year round; in the summer for boating and fishing, and in the winter for ice fishing. There is a beach where Waylanders can pay for a membership.  Lake Cochituate, which consists of four ponds connected by shallow, narrow waterways, is located in the towns of Natick, Framingham, and Wayland, Mass., 16 miles west of Boston. Lake Cochituate lies in the Sudbury River Basin; cochituate means “swift river” in the Algonquin language (Wilbur, 1978) and refers to Cochituate Brook (Schaller and Prescott, 1998), which connects the lake to the Sudbury River.

Demographics

As of the census of 2000, there were 6,768 people, 2,449 households, and 1,851 families residing in the CDP. The population density was 682.3/km2 (1,765.6/mi2). There were 2,516 housing units at an average density of 253.6/km2 (656.4/mi2). The racial makeup of the CDP was 90.90% White, 0.93% Black or African American, 0.09% Native American, 6.24% Asian, 0.06% Pacific Islander, 0.24% from other races, and 1.55% from two or more races. Hispanic or Latino of any race were 1.00% of the population.

There were 2,449 households, out of which 38.5% had children under the age of 18 living with them, 64.9% were married couples living together, 8.5% had a female householder with no husband present, and 24.4% were non-families. 19.7% of all households were made up of individuals, and 9.0% had someone living alone who was 65 years of age or older. The average household size was 2.70 and the average family size was 3.14.

In the CDP, the population was spread out, with 27.2% under the age of 18, 3.5% from 18 to 24, 25.5% from 25 to 44, 27.8% from 45 to 64, and 16.0% who were 65 years of age or older. The median age was 42 years. For every 100 females, there were 91.3 males. For every 100 females age 18 and over, there were 85.8 males.

The median income for a household in the CDP was $89,012, and the median income for a family was $101,362. Males had a median income of $71,500 versus $50,223 for females. The per capita income for the CDP was $42,752. About 1.8% of families and 2.2% of the population were below the poverty line, including 1.1% of those under age 18 and 4.3% of those age 65 or over.

References

Census-designated places in Middlesex County, Massachusetts
Census-designated places in Massachusetts